Henk van der Waal (born 1960) is a Dutch poet.

Early life 

Van der Waal studied philosophy at the University of Amsterdam.

Career 

Van der Waal has worked as a journalist, a translator and as a teacher at the Gerrit Rietveld Academie.

In 1996, he won the C. Buddingh'-prijs for his debut poetry collection De windsels van de sfinx (1995). His second poetry collection Schuldsanering (2000) was nominated for the Paul Snoek-poëzieprijs. He was also nominated for the VSB-Poëzieprijs in 2004 for his poetry collection De aantochtster (2003).

In 2012, he won the Ida Gerhardt Poëzieprijs for his poetry collection Zelf worden. The collection was also nominated for the VSB-Poëzieprijs.

Van der Waal and Erik Lindner wrote the book De kunst van het dichten, a collection of essays and conversations with other poets, including Nachoem Wijnberg, Anneke Brassinga and Anne Vegter. Van der Waal also published Liefdesgeschiedenissen in 1991, a Dutch translation of the work Histoires d'amour (1983) by Bulgarian-French philosopher Julia Kristeva. He has also translated works of Maurice Blanchot, Paul Auster and Hans Faverey.

Awards 
 1996: C. Buddingh'-prijs, De windsels van de sfinx
 2012: Ida Gerhardt Poëzieprijs, Zelf worden

References

External links 
 

1960 births
Living people
Dutch male poets
Academic staff of Gerrit Rietveld Academie
People from Hilversum
University of Amsterdam alumni
C. Buddingh' Prize winners